Rotstergaast  is a village in Skarsterlân in De Fryske Marren municipality in the province of Friesland, the Netherlands. It had a population of around 185 in 2017.

History
The village is first mentioned in 1315 as Rutnergast. It means high sandy ridge belonging to Rottum. Rotstergaast already has two chapel in 1315. One is transformed into a church, however it had become derelict by 1718 and was abandoned. In 1928, a new church was built which is nowadays in use as a village centre. In 1840, Rotstergaast was home to 60 people.

Before 2014, Rotstergaast was part of the Skarsterlân municipality and before 1984 it was part of Haskerland.

References

De Fryske Marren
Populated places in Friesland